Semifruticicola is a monotypic genus of gastropods belonging to the family Hygromiidae. The only species is Semifruticicola serbica.

The species is found in the Balkans.

References

Hygromiidae